The 1986 United States Senate election in Louisiana was held on November 4, 1986. Democratic nominee John Breaux defeated Republican nominee Henson Moore with 52.82% of the vote.

Primary election
Primary elections were held on September 27, 1986.

Candidates
Henson Moore, U.S. Representative from Baton Rouge
John Breaux, U.S. Representative from Crowley
Samuel B. Nunez Jr., State Senator from Chalmette
J. E. Jumonville Jr., State Senator from Ventress
Sherman A. Bernard, Louisiana Insurance Commissioner
Eli Williams
Robert H. Briggs
Frank J. McTopy
Fred Collins
John H. Myers
Ken Lewis
Vincent Giardina
Robert M. Ross
Nels J'Anthony

Results

General election

Candidates
John Breaux, Democratic
Henson Moore, Republican

Results

See also
1986 United States Senate elections

References

1986
Louisiana
United States Senate